The Veldt was a pioneering alternative soul and shoegaze group formed in 1986 in Raleigh, North Carolina by identical twin brothers Daniel and Danny Chavis. The band took their name from a Ray Bradbury science fiction story. After signing with Capitol Records in 1989, the group went on to tour America opening for such groups as The Jesus and Mary Chain and the Cocteau Twins, whose member Robin Guthrie produced their initial recordings. Their 1994 album 'Afrodisiac' is viewed as a classic of the shoegaze genre.

The Veldt have received media coverage from outlets including Pitchfork, Vice, The Guardian, The Huffington Post, All Music Guide, Louder Than War, Stereogum, and many others including praise from producers Joe Foster (My Bloody Valentine, The Jesus and Mary Chain), Robin Guthrie (Cocteau Twins), A.R. Kane, and Doc McKinney (The Weeknd, Drake), alongside collaborators including TV On The Radio, Mos Def and Lady Miss Kier (Deee-Lite), and acts they have opened for such as The Brian Jonestown Massacre, The Pixies, Throwing Muses, Echo & The Bunnymen, Cocteau Twins, Manic Street Preachers, The Jesus and Mary Chain, Oasis, Modern English, Chuck D, Living Colour, and Schooly D.

The Chavis brothers relocated to New York City's East Village in the 1990s and later initiated the musical project Apollo Heights in the 2000s before returning to working under The Veldt moniker in the 2010s.

The Veldt are increasingly recognized as creating a path for marginalized voices and as an influence on the lineage of music that has led to the Alternative R&B success of The Weeknd and Miguel.

History 

Performing since they were children, the Chavis brothers’ musical roots lead back to the church and southern juke-joints, and listening to music that included gospel, Motown and Pink Floyd. The Veldt's early years were spent in Raleigh during the late '80s/early '90s boom in North Carolina's independent
music scene that included acts such as Superchunk, Archers of Loaf, Squirrel Nut Zippers, and Ryan Adams.

Legacy & Influence 
Pitchfork included The Veldt's 1994 album ‘Afrodisiac’ in their list of the top 50 shoegaze albums ever released, and Stereogum included a single from that album, "Until You’re Forever" in their list of 31 essential shoegaze tracks. The Veldt's sound also inspired future alternative artists, including TV On the Radio and Bloc Party, and are regarded as an influence on the sound of 21st century Alternative R&B chart topping artists.

Discography

Albums 
Afrodisiac (1994)
Love At First Hate (1998)
White Music For Black People (2007) – as Apollo Heights
Sad Cabaret Reverie (2011) - as Apollo Heights
 Entropy Is The Mainline To God  (2022)

EPs 
Marigolds (1992)
Universe Boat (1996)
The Shocking Fuzz Of Your Electric Fur - The Drake Equation (2017)

Singles 
"CCCP" (1992)
"Soul In A Jar" (1993)
"Symmetry" (2017)

References

External links 
The Veldt Bandcamp Page
Spotify Profile
Instagram Profile

Musical groups established in 1986
1986 establishments in North Carolina
Musical groups from Raleigh, North Carolina
American shoegaze musical groups